Itauna is a synonym for the South American genus Quiva Hebard, 1927: a bush cricket in the subfamily Phaneropterinae.

References

Tettigoniidae genera